The 1999 National Semi-Professional Football League was thirty-sixth season of National Semi-Professional Football League. The 1999 season was divided into spring league and autumn league. Spring league was held from 8 to 23 April 1999 and autumn league was held from 2 to 16 September 1999.

Participation
Hallelujah FC
Hyundai Mipo Dockyard
Korea Electric Power
Korea National Railroad
National Police Agency
Sangmu FC
Seoul City FC
Several reserve teams of K-League

Spring

League

Semi-finals

Final

Autumn

League

Semi-finals

Final

References

Korean National Semi-Professional Football League
2
South Korea
South Korea